"Come Clean" is a song by American singer Hilary Duff for her second studio album, Metamorphosis (2003). It was written by Kara DioGuardi and John Shanks, while production was handled by Shanks. The song contains influences of electronica, with the lyrics chronicling the protagonist wanting to "come clean" with her love interest, from a strained relationship. "Come Clean" was received by critics with mixed reviews. The song was released on January 12, 2004, as the album's second single.

In the United States, the song peaked at number 35, becoming Duff's first top-40 single on the Billboard Hot 100. It would later go on to become her best-selling single in the United States. However, the song failed to match the success of its predecessor "So Yesterday" in many other countries. It reached number 17 in Australia and number 18 in the United Kingdom while charting within the top 20 in Canada, Ireland, the Netherlands, and New Zealand. A remix of the song by Chris Cox was included in Duff's 2005 compilation album, Most Wanted, this version was also included on her Dignity Walmart edition Remix EP as the Dance Mix in 2007, and in 2008, another remix of the song by Chico Bennett & Richard "Humpty" Vission was included in Best of Hilary Duff while the original version is included on the Japanese edition.

The song was accompanied by a music video, directed Dave Meyers, which showed Duff inside a house on a rainy day, waiting for her love interest. The video was nominated in the category of Best Pop Video at the 2004 MTV Video Music Awards. The song was used in the theatrical trailer for the 2004 film A Cinderella Story, which stars Duff. It was used as the theme song for the MTV reality television shows Laguna Beach: The Real Orange County and Newport Harbor: The Real Orange County, and it is included on the soundtrack album for Laguna Beach.

Composition 

In a 2005 interview with News Times, Duff said that the song is "obviously about a boy and a girl's relationship and it's just talking about how somebody thinks they're in the dark." "She's tired of it and he's tired of it and they're coming clean, whether it means they're gonna be together or not. They're laying all the cards out on the table and coming out with everything that hasn't been said basically.", she said. Duff cited the song as her favorite on Metamorphosis, saying it is "a little more mellow" than her previous single, "So Yesterday", "but it's not really pop. It sounds sort of like techno, but it's slow. It's really cool."

Musically, "Come Clean" is a moderately fast song in a tempo of 120 beats per minute. Written in the key of B major, it features the sequence of Gmj7—E2—Gmj7 as its chord progression. Duff's vocals span from the note of F3 to the note of B4.

Chart performance 
The song debuted on the Billboard Hot 100 chart of February 28, 2004, at number 53, and eventually peaked at number 35, becoming Duff's first top 40 in nation. As of July 27, 2014, the song had sold 655,000 digital copies in the United States.

Music video

Development and release 
The single's music video was directed by Dave Meyers and filmed in Los Angeles on November 23, 2003. Meyers said of the video, "I'm trying to do something where you're taking her [Duff] very seriously ... very dramatic and very feminine, and sort of almost sensual. I don't think we've ever seen that from her. She's been a bit of a pop icon, so I'm just trying to give her a bit more credibility on an artist front."

In the U.S., the video premiered on January 11, 2004, during Nickelodeon's TEENick block. The next day, it made its debut on MTV during an episode of "Making the Video" before premiering on Total Request Live two days later. It entered the show's top ten video countdown the following day at number eight, and spent twenty-five days on the countdown, peaking at number three. It also reached the top 5 of Total Request Live UK.

Synopsis 
In the video, Duff is shown in her house during a rainy day (reflecting the rain reference in the chorus of the song), walking from room to room. Her friends arrive and watch television with her in the living room. The rainstorm intensifies over the course of the day, and the interior scenes are intercut with shots of Duff's boyfriend driving to her house in a car. At the end of the video, the boyfriend arrives at the house, and Duff ventures out into the rain to meet him; they kiss as the video ends. According to Meyers, "We never do know if the guy in the end is a boyfriend or friend or what the drama is. It's just all very photogenic and sophisticated and not too colorful." Duff said that the video "really shows that she's kind of in this monotone mood throughout the whole thing. She doesn't show too much emotion except that she's waiting for this boy, this guy, to come. You can't tell when they're running toward each other if they're gonna kiss or they're gonna hug or they're gonna hit each other. It's a bunch of different emotions."

Reception 
The video was nominated in the category of Best Pop Video at the 2004 MTV Video Music Awards. The song won Duff a TMF Award in the Fake ID Category, and assisted her in winning the 2004 World Music Award for Best New Artist.

Track listings

Personnel 
Adapted from the liner notes
John Shanks – producer
Rob Chiarelli – recording, mixing

Charts

Weekly charts

Year-end charts

Certifications

Release history

References

2003 songs
2004 singles
Hilary Duff songs
Hollywood Records singles
Music videos directed by Dave Meyers (director)
Song recordings produced by John Shanks
Songs written by John Shanks
Songs written by Kara DioGuardi
Television drama theme songs
2000s ballads

pt:Come Clean